The Florida Gators baseball team represents the University of Florida in the sport of baseball.  Florida competes in Division I of the National Collegiate Athletics Association (NCAA), and the Eastern Division of the Southeastern Conference (SEC).  They play their home games in Condron Ballpark on the university's Gainesville, Florida, campus, and are currently led by head coach Kevin O'Sullivan.  In the 105-season history of the Florida baseball program, the team has won 15 SEC championships and has appeared in 12 College World Series tournaments. The Gators won their first national championship in 2017.

History 

The modern University of Florida was created in 1905 when the Florida Legislature passed the Buckman Act, and thereby consolidated the university's four predecessor institutions into the new "University of the State of Florida."  The university fielded its first varsity baseball team, and enjoyed its first winning baseball season, in 1912.

During most of Florida baseball's early existence, the new university's athletic association suffered from a lack of financial resources, and few of the head baseball coaches were full-time baseball coaches.  William G. Kline was also the athletic director, head football coach, and head basketball coach; James L. White was Florida's athletic director and head basketball coach; Brady Cowell, Ben Clemons and Lewie Hardage were assistant football coaches; and Sam McAllister was the head basketball coach and an assistant football coach.  A notable exception was Lance Richbourg, who was a Florida alumnus and a Major League Baseball outfielder for the Boston Braves and others, and led the Gators to an impressive 39–21 overall record (a .650 winning percentage) in 1922, 1923 and 1926.  McAllister was the Gators' last pre-World War II coach, and he returned from military service to lead the Gators baseball team again in 1946 and 1947.

Fuller era: (1948–1975) 

The modern post-war era of the Florida Baseball program began with head coach Dave Fuller assuming control in 1948.  Fuller was originally hired as a physical education instructor in 1946, and also served as an assistant football coach under four different Gators head coaches.  Ultimately, he became the longest-serving Gators head coach in any sport, and won more games than any other Gators coach, after leading the Gators baseball team for 28 seasons.  Fuller brought stability and consistency to the program, and his Gators teams won SEC championships in 1952, 1956 and 1962, and made appearances in the NCAA tournament in 1958, 1960 and 1962.  His final record was 557–354–6 (.611).  Florida

Bergman era: (1976–1981) 

Fuller's successor, Jay Bergman, advanced the Florida baseball program a step further.  After a difficult transition season in 1976, Bergman's Gators showed marked improvement, winning an SEC championship and SEC tournament title in 1981.  His teams also qualified for the NCAA Regionals in 1977, 1979 and 1981, and compiled a 7–6 tournament record, but in each instance did not advance beyond the double-elimination opening round of the NCAA tournament.  In his six seasons as the Gators' skipper, Bergman posted an overall win–loss record of 216–113 (.657)—the best multi-season winning percentage until that time, and still the second best in Gators baseball history.

Arnold era: (1984–1994) 

Joe Arnold followed Jack Rhines' short two-season stint as Florida's head coach.  Arnold's Gators won SEC championships in 1984 and 1988, and SEC tournament titles in 1984, 1988 and 1991.  His teams made seven appearances in the NCAA tournament, and for the first and second time ever, the Gators advanced to the College World Series in 1988 and 1991.  In 11 seasons coaching the Gators, Arnold compiled an overall record of 434–244–2 (.640).

Lopez era: (1995–2000) 

Andy Lopez took over the program in 1995, two seasons removed from leading the Pepperdine Waves of Pepperdine University to their only national championship in the 1992 College World Series.  In his second season as Florida's head coach in 1996, he led the Gators to a 50-win season and the semifinals of the College World Series.  In 2000 and 2001, however, the Gators were eliminated in the opening rounds of the NCAA tournament, and Lopez was replaced.  In seven seasons, Lopez posted an overall record of 278–159–1 (.636).

McMahon era: (2001–2007) 

Pat McMahon became Florida's baseball coach in 2001, after coaching the Mississippi State Bulldogs for the four preceding seasons.

Early in the 2003 season, the Gators began to make a comeback with several freshly scouted prospects, including Andy Ramirez (first base) David Headage (right field), and Randy Thompson (shortstop).  The 2003 season set the standard for the next two years of baseball, entering the NCAA tournament in both the 2003 and 2004 seasons.  The 2005 season was the best in school history, as the team won the SEC championship and advanced to the College World Series for the first time in seven years, ultimately losing to the Texas Longhorns, two games to none in the final championship round of the Series.

The expectations for the Gators were high in 2006; they were the consensus No. 1 team in the preseason polls, but the team struggled through the 2006 season.  The Gators found themselves one game under .500 (26–27) heading into their final series against the LSU Tigers in Gainesville.  The team surprisingly won two of the three games to finish the season at .500 (28–28).  The Gators' 10–20 SEC record was the second worst in the conference, and they did not qualify for the SEC Tournament, nor were they selected for the NCAA Regionals.

After missing the NCAA Regionals again in 2007, McMahon was fired on June 7, 2007.  McMahon finished his six seasons as the Gators' head coach with an overall record of 202–113–1 (.641).

O'Sullivan era: (2008–present) 

Kevin O'Sullivan became the head coach of the Florida baseball team following the 2007 season.  In each of his first four seasons, O'Sullivan's Gators improved their overall record and SEC standing.  In 2008, his first season as the Gators' skipper, the team finished 34–24 overall, 17–13 in SEC play, and in second place in the SEC Eastern Division standings.  In 2009, the Gators compiled an overall record of 42–22, 19–11 in the SEC, and in first place in the SEC Eastern Division.  O'Sullivan's 2010 Gators finished with an overall win–loss record of 47–17, 22–8 in SEC play, and SEC regular season champions.  In each of his first three seasons, his Gators also showed post-season improvement, too: early elimination in the NCAA Regional in 2008; progressing to the NCAA Super Regional in 2009; and a berth in the College World Series in 2010.

In 2011, Florida finished the regular season 41–15 overall, 22–8 in the SEC, and SEC regular season co-champions—sharing the regular season conference title with the South Carolina Gamecocks and Vanderbilt Commodores.  After defeating the Mississippi State Bulldogs, Alabama Crimson Tide, Georgia Bulldogs and Vanderbilt Commodores to win the SEC tournament, the Gators received the overall No. 2 seed in the sixty-four team NCAA tournament.  The Gators swept the NCAA Regional three games to none, and beat the Mississippi State Bulldogs two games to one in the NCAA Super Regional, and advanced to the 2011 College World Series.  By beating the seventh-seeded Texas Longhorns 8–4 in the opening game of the 2011 Series, and then defeating the sixth-seeded Vanderbilt Commodores twice, 3–1 and 6–4, the Gators earned a berth in the best-of-three College World Series championship finals.  In the championship finals, the South Carolina Gamecocks defeated the Gators in two straight games, 2–1 and 5–2; the Gators finished the 2011 season with an overall record of 53–19—the most games the Gators have ever won in a single season.

Florida finished the 2012 regular season with a record of 40–16, and were selected as the No. 1 seed in the 2012 NCAA Division I baseball tournament.  Jonathon Crawford pitched the seventh no-hitter in NCAA Tournament history against the Bethune-Cookman Wildcats in the opening round of the Gainesville Regional.  The Gators swept the double-elimination regional tournament in three straight wins over Bethune-Cookman (4–0) and the Georgia Tech Yellow Jackets (6–1, 15–3), and then swept the NC State Wolfpack in two straight games to win the best-of-three Gainesville Super Regional (7–1, 9–8) and earn a bid to the 2012 College World Series.  The 2012 season came to an abrupt end in the College World Series, as the Gators lost their first two games to the South Carolina Gamecocks 7–3 and the Kent State Golden Flashes 5–4.

Florida returned to the College World Series for the ninth time in 2015 and for the tenth time in 2016. The Gators made their 11th College World Series in 2017, finally breaking through and winning their first national championship after sweeping LSU two games to none in the championship series.  They returned to the College World Series in 2018 to defend their title, but fell to Arkansas in the semifinals. After an up-and-down 2019 campaign, the 2020 Gators got off to a school-best 16–1 start before the remainder of the season was cancelled due to the COVID-19 pandemic.

Stadium facilities 

Condron Ballpark at Alfred A. McKethan Field is the home field for the Florida baseball team. The playing surface is named for Florida alumnus Alfred A. McKethan and is located on the University of Florida's Gainesville campus. The stadium includes seating for approximately 7,000 fans (expandable to 10,000), a press box, locker rooms and coaching staff offices. The ballpark replaced Alfred A. McKethan Stadium at Perry Field after the 2020 season.

Home plate faces northeast with the sun behind the stadium to provide shade for fans. A 360-degree open concourse allows fans a constant field view. Permanent chairback seats accommodate 4,000 spectators, with 700 club seats, berm capacity of over 2,000, and an option to temporarily expand capacity to around 10,000. The new ballpark is adjacent to Pressly Softball Stadium and Dizney Stadium for lacrosse. McKethan Stadium was demolished to make way for the James W. "Bill" Heavener Complex, a football training facility.

Head coaches

Year-by-year results

College World Series appearances 
The Florida Gators have reached the College World Series 12 different times, including three consecutive trips from 2010 to 2012 and four consecutive trips from 2015 to 2018 under Kevin O'Sullivan.

Florida in the NCAA tournament 

The NCAA Division I baseball tournament started in 1947.
The format of the tournament has changed through the years.

Championships

National championships 

Florida won its first national championship in 2017, sweeping rival LSU in the CWS Championship Series to emerge victorious in the school's third CWS Finals appearance.

The Gators have also reached the College World Series Championship Series two additional times, getting swept both times.

SEC regular season championships 

The Gators have won a total of 15 SEC regular season championships, second most among the 14 current SEC members. Their most recent title came in 2018 under Kevin O'Sullivan.

SEC Tournament championships 

The Gators have won seven SEC Tournament championships, third most among the SEC's current 14 members. However, after winning five in 11 years from 1981 to 1991, it was 20 years before Kevin O'Sullivan led the Gators to their sixth SEC Tournament Championship in 2011.

Player awards

National awards
Dick Howser Trophy
Mike Zunino (2012)
Brady Singer (2018)
Golden Spikes Award
Mike Zunino (2012)
Baseball America College Player of the Year Award
Mike Zunino (2012)
Rotary Smith Award
Brad Wilkerson (1998)
Senior CLASS Award
Brandon McArthur (2009)
John Olerud Award
Brian Johnson (2012)
Collegiate Baseball Freshman Player of the Year
JJ Schwarz (2015)

SEC Awards
Player of the Year
Matt LaPorta (2005, 2007)
Mike Zunino (2011)
Pitcher of the Year
Justin Hoyman (2004)
Brady Singer (2018)
Freshman of the Year
Preston Tucker (2009)
Austin Maddox (2010)
Austin Cousino (2012)
Logan Shore (2014)

Florida's first Team All-Americans

Former players in Major League Baseball

Many former Florida Gator baseball players have gone on to play in Major League Baseball and other professional leagues. As of 2015, over 170 UF alumni have been chosen in the Major League Baseball draft and over 60 players have appeared in a Major League game. The first was Lance Richbourg, who made his MLB debut with the Philadelphia Phillies in 1921. Other notable alumni include 1953 American League MVP Al Rosen, 2006 World Series MVP David Eckstein, Gold Glove Award winner Harrison Bader, and former Boston Red Sox managing general partner Haywood Sullivan.

See also 

 Florida Gators
 List of Florida Gators baseball players
 List of NCAA Division I baseball programs
 List of University of Florida Olympians

References

External links 
 

 
Baseball teams established in 1912
1912 establishments in Florida